Samuel Ira Scheffler (born 1951) is a moral and political philosopher, who is University Professor of Philosophy and Law in the Department of Philosophy and the School of Law at New York University.

Education and career 

Before moving to NYU in 2008, Scheffler taught for 31 years at the University of California, Berkeley. Scheffler received his PhD from Princeton University, where he was a student of the philosopher Thomas Nagel. He was elected a fellow of the American Academy of Arts and Sciences in 2004.

He is the son of the Harvard philosopher Israel Scheffler.

He is a member of the Norwegian Academy of Science and Letters.

Philosophical work 

His most recent book, Death and the Afterlife, based on his Tanner Lectures at University of California, Berkeley has generated considerable attention for its argument that much that we value in life depends on the assumption that life will continue long after our death.  As the Princeton philosopher Mark Johnston explained in Boston Review:  Assessing the argument, the English philosopher John Cottingham wrote: "Scheffler has produced a superb essay – indeed it seems to me about as good as analytic philosophy gets. It is entirely free from obfuscating jargon and other tiresome tricks of the trade, yet it is meticulously argued and demanding in exactly the right way – forcing us to think about hitherto unexamined implications of our existing beliefs."

Selected books
Why Worry About Future Generations (Oxford University Press, 2018)
Death and the Afterlife (Oxford University Press, 2013)
Equality and Tradition (Oxford University Press, 2010)
Boundaries and Allegiances: Problems of Justice and Responsibility in Liberal Thought (Oxford University Press, 2001)
The Rejection of Consequentialism (Oxford University Press 2nd ed., 1994) (editor)
Human Morality (Oxford University Press, 1992)

References

External links
Video interview with Scheffler.

New York University faculty
Living people
20th-century American philosophers
21st-century American philosophers
1951 births
Princeton University alumni
Harvard University alumni
University of California, Berkeley faculty
Fellows of the American Academy of Arts and Sciences
Analytic philosophers
Political philosophers
Members of the Norwegian Academy of Science and Letters